Joseph-Alphonse-Anaclet Habel (July 13, 1895 – December 5, 1979), usually known as Joseph-Anaclet Habel, was a Canadian politician.

Born in Deschaillons, Quebec, the son of Wenceslas Habel and Henriette Charland, he served in the Canadian Army during World War I. From 1919 to 1926, he ran a general store in Amos.

Habel then moved to Fauquier, Ontario, serving as reeve of the township of Shackleton and Machin and living there until 1943, when he moved to Kapuskasing.

In 1934, he was elected to the Legislative Assembly of Ontario for the riding of Cochrane North. An Ontario Liberal, he was re-elected in 1937 and 1945.

In 1953, he was elected to the House of Commons of Canada for the riding of Cochrane. A Liberal, he was re-elected in 1957, 1958, 1962, 1963, and 1965. From 1958 to 1963, he was the Chief Opposition Whip.

He married Estelle Belleau in 1921 and they had two children: Madeleine and Jean Paul.

References
 
 

1895 births
1979 deaths
Canadian military personnel of World War I
Liberal Party of Canada MPs
Ontario Liberal Party MPPs
Members of the House of Commons of Canada from Ontario
Franco-Ontarian people
Mayors of places in Ontario
People from Kapuskasing